Christopher Plunkett, 6th Baron of Dunsany (died 1564 or 1565) was an Irish nobleman.

Family 
He was the second son of Robert Plunkett Baron of Dunsany, and his wife Eleanor (née Darcy), daughter of the Lord Treasurer of Ireland, Sir William Darcy, of Platten. John Hussey, 7th Baron Galtrim. He succeeded his father in the title in 1556, as his elder brother John had predeceased him. His niece, John's daughter Elizabeth, the heir general of Dunsany, married Nicholas Hollywood of Artane, Dublin, and they had two sons, Christopher and Nicholas.

Plunkett married Elizabeth Barnewall, daughter of Christopher Barnewall, Knight, of Crickstown. He died between 29 May 1564 and 28 August 1565, and was succeeded by his son, Patrick. His widow later remarried.

References 

1560s deaths
Barons of Dunsany
16th-century Anglo-Irish people
Year of birth unknown

Year of death uncertain